James Julien "Pug" Southerland II (October 28, 1911 – October 12, 1949) was a United States Navy fighter pilot during World War II. He was an ace, being credited with five victories (some accounts say seven), flying Grumman F4F Wildcats. He was awarded the Silver Star, Distinguished Flying Cross twice, and the Purple Heart.

Early life
Born in Narberth, Montgomery County, Pennsylvania, Southerland graduated from the United States Naval Academy at Annapolis, Maryland in 1936. Rear Admiral David Richardson, who served with him, said Southerland gained the nickname "Pug" because he was such a pugnacious boxer at the academy. Southerland became an aviator and meant to make the Navy his career.

World War II

Dogfight over Guadalcanal
At the beginning of the Battle of Guadalcanal, August 7, 1942, American forces shelled Guadalcanal and neighboring Tulagi in the Solomon Islands. Soon after the attack began, 27 Japanese bombers and an escort of 17 fighters took off from Rabaul, Japan's stronghold and strategic base in the South Pacific. Their mission was to bomb the ships that were supporting the American attack.

Due to planning errors and the loss of planes to a recent training exercise, this was the only fighter cover available to patrol the landing area. Southerland (flying Wildcat F-12) and his flight took off to intercept the Japanese bombers before they could reach the American ships.

Southerland shot down the first Japanese aircraft of the Guadalcanal campaign, a G4M1 "Betty" bomber of the 4th Kōkūtai, under the command of Shizuo Yamada. After shooting down a second bomber, Southerland was engaged in a dogfight with an A6M2 "Zero", piloted by Yamazaki Ichirobei of the Tainan Kōkūtai. He lined up the Zero in his sights only to find his guns would not fire, probably due to damage from fire by the tailgunner from the second bomber he had downed.

Although he was now defenseless, Southerland had to stay in the fight. Two more Zeros engaged him, as Kakimoto Enji and Uto Kazushi joined Yamazaki's assault, but he successfully outmaneuvered all three of them. Southerland analyzed their tactics. Two fighters worked their runs from opposite flanks, while the third waited to take its turn. He coolly and carefully executed his defensive maneuvers. The dogfight was spotted by Saburo Sakai. Sakai also joined the battle. These Zeros finally shot down Southerland's Wildcat, striking it below the left wing root with his 20mm cannon. Yamazaki, Uto and Sakai shared Southerland's Grumman kill. Southerland later wrote:

As Southerland bailed out of his doomed Wildcat, his .45 caliber automatic pistol caught in the cockpit. He managed to free himself, but lost his pistol, leaving him weaponless, wounded, and alone behind enemy lines. Suffering from eleven wounds, shock and exhaustion, Southerland struggled through the brush, carefully evading Japanese soldiers. He finally reached the coast, where he was found by some natives, who at the risk of their own lives, fed him and treated his wounds. With their assistance, he eluded Japanese ground forces and returned to American lines. Southerland was evacuated from Guadalcanal on the first patrol boat to land at Henderson Field, on August 20, 1942.

On February 14, 1948, the wreckage of Southerland's Wildcat was found, including his pistol. Investigation of the remains confirmed these accounts of the dogfight.

Later war
Southerland later fought in the Battle of Okinawa in 1945.

Last years
Following the war, Southerland became a flight instructor at the U.S. Naval Academy. He was killed in a jet training accident in 1949 during takeoff from a carrier off the Florida coast.

References

Bibliography
The Associated Press. "Flier Fights 31 Japanese Planes; Has 11 Wounds When He Bails Out; Lieut. Southerland of Navy, Back From the Solomons, Recounts Air Battle and Escape With Natives' Help." New York Times. Mar 15, 1943.
Hammel, Eric.  Carrier Clash: The Invasion of Guadalcanal and the Battle of the Eastern Solomons August 1942. Zenith Press, 2004. 

Sakai, Saburo. Samurai! I Books; New Ed edition, 2001. 
Styling, Mark. The Blue Devils. Osprey Publishing, 2003.

External links
Account of Sutherland's fight with Saburo Sakai
Excerpt from Saburo Sakai's book Samurai! about their famous dogfight.
Dogfight Over Guadalcanal, a documentary produced by the PBS series Secrets of the Dead

1911 births
1949 deaths
American World War II flying aces
United States Navy pilots of World War II
Aviators from Pennsylvania
Aviators killed in aviation accidents or incidents in the United States
People from Narberth, Pennsylvania
Recipients of the Legion of Merit
Recipients of the Distinguished Flying Cross (United States)
Recipients of the Silver Star
Shot-down aviators
United States Naval Academy alumni
United States Naval Aviators
United States Navy officers
American flight instructors
Victims of aviation accidents or incidents in 1949
Military personnel from Pennsylvania